Taekwondo at the 2011 Southeast Asian Games was held in POPKI Sport Hall, Cibubur, Indonesia.

Medal summary

Poomsae

Gyeorugi

Men

Women

Medal table

External links
  2011 Southeast Asian Games

Taekw
Southeast Asian Games
2011